Robert Traill may refer to:
Robert Traill of Greyfriars (1603-1678) minister of Greyfriars, Edinburgh and refugee in Holland
Robert Traill (minister) (1642-1716) minister in Kent, author and prisoner on the Bass Rock
Robert Traill (clergyman) (1793–1847), Irish clergyman
Robert Henry Traill or Roy Traill (1892–1989), New Zealand wildlife ranger

See also
Robert Traill Spence Lowell (1816–1891), US clergyman
Robert Traill Spence Lowell IV (1917–1977), US poet